Vladan Grujić (born 17 May 1981) is a Bosnian retired footballer who played as a defensive midfielder.

Club career
Born in Banja Luka, SR Bosnia and Herzegovina, back then within Yugoslavia, Vladan Grujić played for FK Borac Banja Luka and Serbian clubs FK Obilić and Red Star Belgrade. Since, Grujić has played for the German club 1. FC Köln before moving to Alania Vladikavkaz. In January 2006, he left Alania on a free transfer and joined Bulgarian side Litex Lovech on 28 January 2007. He signed a six-month contract with FK Sarajevo.

On 29 February 2008, he signed a three-year contract with Norwegian club Moss FK.

In November 2009, he was released by Moss FK and was available on free transfer.

In January 2010, he was on trial at the Polish second division club Gornik Zabrze.

In June 2011, he signed a two-year contract with Cypriot club Aris Limassol F.C.

On 21 July 2015, after playing two seasons with FK Borac Banja Luka in the Bosnian Premier League, Grujić returns to Serbia, this time by signing with top-flight club FK Voždovac.

International career
Grujić made his debut for Bosnia and Herzegovina in an October 2002 European Championship qualification match away against Norway and has earned a total of 24 caps, scoring no goals. His final international was an October 2006 European Championship qualification match against Greece.

References

External links
 
 

1981 births
Living people
Sportspeople from Banja Luka
Serbs of Bosnia and Herzegovina
Association football midfielders
Bosnia and Herzegovina footballers
Bosnia and Herzegovina under-21 international footballers
Bosnia and Herzegovina international footballers
FK Borac Banja Luka players
FK Obilić players
Red Star Belgrade footballers
1. FC Köln players
FC Spartak Vladikavkaz players
PFC Litex Lovech players
FK Sarajevo players
Moss FK players
FK Laktaši players
AEP Paphos FC players
Aris Limassol FC players
FK Voždovac players
Premier League of Bosnia and Herzegovina players
First League of Serbia and Montenegro players
Bundesliga players
2. Bundesliga players
Russian Premier League players
First Professional Football League (Bulgaria) players
Norwegian First Division players
Cypriot First Division players
Bosnia and Herzegovina expatriate footballers
Expatriate footballers in Serbia and Montenegro
Bosnia and Herzegovina expatriate sportspeople in Serbia and Montenegro
Expatriate footballers in Germany
Bosnia and Herzegovina expatriate sportspeople in Germany
Expatriate footballers in Russia
Bosnia and Herzegovina expatriate sportspeople in Russia
Expatriate footballers in Bulgaria
Bosnia and Herzegovina expatriate sportspeople in Bulgaria
Expatriate footballers in Norway
Bosnia and Herzegovina expatriate sportspeople in Norway
Expatriate footballers in Cyprus
Bosnia and Herzegovina expatriate sportspeople in Cyprus
Expatriate footballers in Serbia
Bosnia and Herzegovina expatriate sportspeople in Serbia